Marcel Dierkens (3 September 1925 – 19 September 2008) was a Luxembourgian racing cyclist. He finished in last place in the 1954 Tour de France.

References

External links

1925 births
2008 deaths
Luxembourgian male cyclists
People from Rambrouch